The 1989–90 FIRA Trophy was the 28th edition of a European rugby union championship for national teams. The format returned to a one-year tournament, with each team facing each other only once.

The tournament was won by France, Romania and Soviet Union, who all finished with three wins and one loss, and the same points. France only awarded caps in their 12-6 loss at home to Romania. Italy finished in a disappointing 4th place, with a single win, while Poland lost all their four games and was relegated. Their best result was a 25-19 loss to Romania abroad, in a game where the Romanians didn't awarded caps.

Portugal and Spain where the winners of the Second division groups, facing each other's in a final, won by the Spaniards (29-6).

First division

 Poland Relegated to division 2

Second division

Pool A

The first match between Tunisia and Morocco was tied. The two unions, according with FIRA, agreed to considered valid for tournament the match originally valid only for Rugby World Cup 1991 qualification instead the first one.

The match between Belgium and Tunisia, scheduled in Brussels, was not played.

Pool B

Final

Third division

Bibliography
 Francesco Volpe, Valerio Vecchiarelli (2000), 2000 Italia in Meta, Storia della nazionale italiana di rugby dagli albori al Sei Nazioni, GS Editore (2000) .
 Francesco Volpe, Paolo Pacitti (Author), Rugby 2000, GTE Gruppo Editorale (1999).

References

External links
1989-90 FIRA Trophy at ESPN

1989-90
1989–90 in European rugby union
1989 rugby union tournaments for national teams
1990 rugby union tournaments for national teams